Nuraisyah Jamil (born 12 July 1996) is a Malaysian sailor. She competed in the women's 470 event at the 2020 Summer Olympics.

References

External links
 

1996 births
Living people
People from Johor
Malaysian female sailors (sport)
Olympic sailors of Malaysia
Sailors at the 2020 Summer Olympics – 470
Southeast Asian Games silver medalists for Malaysia
Asian Games medalists in sailing
Sailors at the 2014 Asian Games
Sailors at the 2018 Asian Games
Medalists at the 2014 Asian Games
Medalists at the 2018 Asian Games
Asian Games silver medalists for Malaysia
Asian Games bronze medalists for Malaysia
21st-century Malaysian women
Southeast Asian Games medalists in sailing